Mr. Children 1992–1995, is a compilation album by Mr. Children, released on July 11, 2001.

This is a compilation of selected album and single tracks from 1992 to 1995, released on the same day as Mr. Children 1996–2000. It is the sixth best-selling album of 2001 in Japan, according to Oricon.

Track listing
 君がいた夏(Kimi Ga Ita Natsu) - 5:53
 星になれたら(Hoshi Ni Naretara - 5:03
 抱きしめたい(Dakishimetai) - 5:26
 Replay  - 4:31
 LOVE - 4:07
 my life  - 4:29
 CROSS ROAD - 4:35
 innocent world  - 5:47
 Dance Dance Dance - 4:59
 雨のち晴れ(Ame Nochi Hare) - 5:37
 Over  - 4:44
 Tomorrow never knows - 5:09 
 everybody goes -秩序のない現代にドロップキック- - 4:38
 【es】 ～Theme of es～ - 5:51
 シーソーゲーム ～勇敢な恋の歌～ - 4:31

Mr. Children albums
2001 compilation albums